This is the list of Soviet computer systems. The Russian abbreviation EVM (ЭВМ), present in some of the names below, means  “electronic computing machine”.

List of hardware
The Russian abbreviation EVM (ЭВМ), present in some of the names below, means  “electronic computing machine”.

Ministry of Radio Technology

Computer systems from the Ministry of Radio Technology:
 Agat (Агат) — Apple II clone
 ES EVM (ЕС ЭВМ), IBM mainframe clone
 ES PEVM (ЕС ПЭВМ), IBM PC compatible
 M series — series of mainframes and mini-computers
 Minsk (Минск)
 Poisk (Поиск) — IBM PC XT clone
 Setun (Сетунь) — unique balanced ternary computer.
 Strela (Стрела)
 Ural (Урал) — mainframe series
 Vector-06C (Вектор-06Ц)

Ministry of Instrument Making

Computer systems from the Ministry of Instrument Making:
 Aragats (Арагац)
 Iskra (Искра) — common name for many computers with different architecture
 Iskra-1030 — Intel 8086 XT clone
 KVM-1 (КВМ-1)
 SM EVM (СМ ЭВМ) — most models were PDP-11 clones, while some others were HP 2100, VAX or Intel compatible

Ministry of the Electronics Industry
Computer systems from the Ministry of Electronics Industry:
 Elektronika (Электроника) family
 DVK family (ДВК) — PDP-11 clones
 Elektronika BK-0010 (БК-0010, БК-0011) — LSI-11 clone home computer
 UKNC (УКНЦ) — educational, PDP11-like
 Elektronika 60, Elektronika 100
 Elektronika 85 — Clone of DEC Professional (computer) 350 (F11)
 Elektronika 85.1 — Clone of DEC Professional (computer) 380 (J11)
 Elektronika D3-28
 Elektronika SS BIS (Электроника СС БИС) — Cray clone

Soviet Academy of Sciences

 BESM (БЭСМ) — series of mainframes
 Besta (Беста) — Unix box, Motorola 68020-based, Sun-3 clone
 Elbrus (Эльбрус) — high-end mainframe series
 Kronos (Кронос)
 MESM (МЭСМ) — first Soviet Union computer (1950)
 M-1 — one of the earliest stored program computers (1950-1951)

ZX Spectrum clones

 ATM Turbo 
 Dubna 48K - running at half the speed of the original
 Hobbit 
 Pentagon 
 Radon 'Z' 
 Scorpion

Other
 5E** (5Э**) series - military computers
 5E51 (5Э51)
 5E53 (5Э53)
 5E76 (5Э76) - IBM/360 clone, military version
 5E92 (5Э92)
 5E92b (5Э92б)
 A series — ES EVM-compatible military computers 
 Argon — a series of military real-time computers 
 AS-6 (АС-6) - multiprocessor computing complex, name is Russian abbreviation for "Connection Equipment - 6"
 Dnepr (Днепр)
 GVS-100 (ГВС-100, Гибридная Вичислителная Система) - Hybrid Computer System
 Irisha (Ириша)
 Juku (Юку) — Estonian school computer
 Kiev (Киев)
 Korvet (Корвет)
 Krista (Криста)
 Micro-80 (Микро-80) — experimental PC, based on 8080-compatible processor
 Microsha (Микроша) — modification of Radio-86RK
 MIR, МИР (:uk:ЕОМ "МИР-1", :uk:ЕОМ "МИР-2") 
 Nairi (Наири)
 Orion-128 (Орион-128)
 Promin (Проминь)
 PS-2000, PS-3000 — multiprocessor supercomputers in the 1980s
 Razdan (Раздан)
 Radon — real-time computer, designed for anti-aircraft defense 
 Radio-86RK — simplified and modified version of Micro-80
 Sneg (Снег)
 Specialist (Специалист)
 SVS
 TsUM-1 (ЦУМ-1)
 TIA-MC-1 An arcade system
 UM (УМ)
 UT-88
 Vesna and Sneg — early mainframes

List of operating systems
For Kronos
Kronos
For BESM
D-68 (Д-68, Диспетчер-68, Dispatcher-68)
DISPAK (“Диспетчер Пакетов,” Dispatcher of the Packets)
DUBNA (“ДУБНА”)
For ES EVM
DOS/ES (“Disk Operation system for ES EVM”)
OS/ES (“Disk Operation system for ES EVM”)
 For SM EVM
 RAFOS (РАФОС), FOBOS (ФОБОС) and FODOS (ФОДОС) — RT-11 clones
 OSRV (ОСРВ) — RSX-11M clone, one of the most popular Soviet multi-user systems 
 DEMOS  — BSD-based Unix-like; later was ported to x86 and some other architectures
 INMOS (ИНМОС, Инструментальная мобильная операционная система)
For 8-bit microcomputers
 MicroDOS (МикроДОС) — CP/M 2.2 clone
For ZX Spectrum clones
iS-DOS, TASiS
DNA-OS
For different platforms
MISS (Multipurpose Interactive timeSharing System) - ES EVM ES1010, ES EVM ES1045, D3-28M, PC-compatible, etc.
MOS (operating system) -  a Soviet clone of Unix in the 1980s

See also
 History of computing in the Soviet Union
 List of Soviet microprocessors
 List of Russian IT developers
 List of Russian microprocessors
 Internet in Russia

References

External links 
Russian Virtual Computer Museum
Museum of the USSR Computers history
Pioneers of Soviet Computing
Archive software and documentation for Soviet computers UK-NC, DVK and BK0010.
 

Computing-related lists